Rubén Darío Bustos Torres (born August 18, 1981) is a Colombian retired football player, He played as a defender 

Rubén Darío is often confused with his brother, Darío Alberto Bustos, who is also a Colombian football player currently playing for Cúcuta Deportivo; he has 4 children, whose names are Diego Fernando Bustos, who plays in the 
America de Cali under 17 soccer team, Fredy Emanuel Bustos, who plays in traveling team in the US named South Miami United F.C., Samuel Bustos, and Santiago Bustos.
 
He was part of Cúcuta 2006 Colombian 1st division Championship and helped Cúcuta Deportivo from the Copa Mustang get to the semifinals of the Copa Libertadores 2007. He scored the 2 goals by free kicks to help Cúcuta reach the semifinals. In July 2007 he signed on loan with Gremio in Brasil. After Campeonato Brasileiro 2007, Bustos signed a professional contract with Brazilian team Internacional, main rival of his last team. For 2009, Bustos has been contacted to play again back in his country for Millonarios de Bogotá. Millonarios' coach Oscar Quintabani and president of Millonarios Juan Carlos Lopez have confirmed the transaction on loan.

Bustos has moved back to Internacional in 2010, where he is contracted until 2012, but he was dropped to the club's reserves team. In July 2011, he moved to his first professional team América de Cali.

In November 2007, he helped Colombia win both its matches of the 2010 FIFA World Cup qualification (CONMEBOL) versus Venezuela and Argentina by scoring two free kick goals.

References

External links
 

1981 births
Living people
Colombian footballers
Colombian expatriate footballers
América de Cali footballers
Atlético Nacional footballers
Cúcuta Deportivo footballers
Grêmio Foot-Ball Porto Alegrense players
Sport Club Internacional players
Millonarios F.C. players
Boyacá Chicó F.C. footballers
Ayacucho FC footballers
Categoría Primera A players
Categoría Primera B players
Campeonato Brasileiro Série A players
Expatriate footballers in Brazil
Expatriate footballers in Peru
Colombia international footballers
2003 CONCACAF Gold Cup players
Association football fullbacks
People from Norte de Santander Department
20th-century Colombian people
21st-century Colombian people